Jimmy Hendriks (born 19 March 1994) is a Dutch darts player who competes in Professional Darts Corporation events.

Career

BDO
He won the WDF World Youth Cup and World Youth Masters in 2011 and the Lithuania Open in 2012; 2012 proved to be a successful year for 18-year-old Hendriks who also made it to the quarter-final in the German Open, Welsh Masters and Swiss Open. He defeated the three-time BDO champion Martin Adams in the first round of the 2013 BDO World Darts Championship.

Hendriks has also seen success playing in pairs tournaments, achieving 2012 victories in the Isle-of-Man Pairs (with Tony O'Shea, the England Open Pairs (with Brian Dawson) and the German Open Pairs (with Scott Mitchell).

PDC
Hendriks entered the Professional Darts Corporation's Qualifying School in 2017. A last 16 finish on the third day and a last 8 finish on the fourth saw him finish second on the Q School Order of Merit to pick up a 2-year Tour Card.

World Championship results

BDO
 2013: Second round (lost to Richie George 2–4)
 2017: Preliminary round (lost to David Cameron 1–3)

PDC
 2023: Second round (lost to Brendan Dolan 1–3)

Performance timeline

PDC European Tour

References

External links
 

1994 births
Living people
Professional Darts Corporation current tour card holders
Dutch darts players
People from Heemskerk
Sportspeople from North Holland